I Don't Think I Can Do This Anymore is the third and final studio album by British emo band Moose Blood. The album was released on 9 March 2018. It was followed by a tour of the UK and Northern America.

Reception

I Don't Think I Can Do This Anymore received mixed to positive reviews from critics upon release. On Metacritic, the album holds a score of 65/100 based on 5 reviews, indicating "generally favorable reviews."

Track listing

Charts

References

2018 albums
Emo albums by English artists
Moose Blood albums
Albums produced by Beau Burchell